Alto Zaza is a town and commune in Angola, located in the province of Uíge.

Its unique feature identifier is 2857918 while its unique name identifier is 3997092.

See also 
 Communes of Angola

References 

Populated places in Uíge Province